Mereg (also known as Mark, Merek, Merk, and Mirg) is a village in Sarkal Rural District, in the Central District of Marivan County, Kurdistan Province, Iran. As of the 2006 census, it had a  population of 372, distributed among 80 families. The village is populated by Kurds.

References 

Towns and villages in Marivan County
Kurdish settlements in Kurdistan Province